This is a list of prefects of Istria County.

Prefects of Istria County (1993–present)

See also
Istria County

Notes

External links
World Statesmen - Istria County

Istria County